M2 (M Kettő) is a Hungarian television channel owned and operated by Duna Média since 2015. It is also transmitted in high definition.

On 22 December 2012, M2's daytime hours became dedicated to children's programming. Since 15 March 2015, the night-time programming is called M2 Petőfi.

Similar to TVP ABC in Poland, CBeebies, CBBC and BBC Three in the UK, M2 broadcasts children's programming during the day while M2 Petőfi  targets youth audiences as they broadcast at night with music videos (local and abroad), music-related (music concerts) and youth-related programming, as well as exclusive content from its radio counterpart, Petőfi Rádió.

History 

M2 launched its children block on 22 December 2012 at 05:00 CET. It’s mai cazzate movies.

On 3 November 2021, M2 Petőfi, the prime-time adult block, will be rebranded for the first time since 2015. The rebranding will reflect as well as M2, the main children channel that the new look debuted on 1 October 2020.

Programming
 44 Cats
 64 Zoo Lane
 Aladdin
 Albert felfedezőúton (a coproduction with Germany)
 ALVINNN! and the Chipmunks
 Ben & Holly's Little Kingdom
 Blaze and the Monster Machines
 Bob the Builder
 I Got a Rocket
 Cubs (French animated series)
 Chuggington
 Derítsük ki!
 Dínók nyomában
 Doodleboo
 Doug
 Ducktales
 Emma's Theatre
 Fantasy Patrol
 Fantasy Patrol: The Chronicles
 Fifi and the Flowertots
 Fireman Sam
 Franklin and Friends
 Geronimo Stilton
 Go Jetters 
 Hetedhét kaland
 Inami
 Jelly Jamm
 Jungle Cubs
 Kerwhizz 
 Kick Buttowski
 Kid Lucky
 Lola & Virginia
 Lóti and Futi
 Lilo & Stitch
 Max & Ruby
 Messy Goes to Okido
 MeteoHeroes 
 Mona & Sketch
 Mickey mouse Clubhouse
 Mickey mouse Mixed-up Adventures 
 Miss BG
 Miss Spider's Sunny Patch Friends
 Milo
 Nefertine on the Nile
 Nutri Ventures – The Quest for the 7 Kingdoms
 Noddy, Toyland Detective
 Octonauts
 PAW Patrol
 Peppa Pig
 Percy's Tiger Tales
 Peter Rabbit
 Pinocchio and Friends
 Postman Pat (Season 3-5)
 Q Pootle 5
 Ricky Zoom
 Roary the Racing Car
 Rolie Polie Olie
 Rainbow Ruby
 Raju, the Rickshaw
 Rozmaring kunyhó
 Sadie Sparks
 SamSam
 Sandra the Fairytale Detective
 Shaun the Sheep
 Sherlock Yack
 Sunny Day
 Sofia The First
 Strawberry Shortcake
 Super Wings
 Tall Tales
 The Magic Roundabout
 Uki
 Uncle Grandpa
 Vipo: Adventures of the Flying Dog
 Vipo & Friends: Surviving Time Island
 Wild Kratts
 Wizards of Waverly Place
 Wussywat the Clumsy Cat
 Zoe Wants to Be
 Zoobomafoo

See also
Eastern Bloc information dissemination

External links

M2
M2 presentation at TVARK

Eastern Bloc mass media
Television networks in Hungary
Television channels and stations established in 1971
1971 establishments in Hungary
Mass media in Budapest
Children's television networks
MTVA (Hungary)